The Gyalrongic languages (also known as Rgyalrongic or Jiarongic) constitute a branch of the Qiangic languages of Sino-Tibetan, although some propose that it may be part of a larger Rung languages group, and do not consider it to be particularly closely related to Qiangic, suggesting that similarities between Gyalrongic and Qiangic may be due to areal influence. However, other work suggests that Qiangic as a whole may in fact be paraphyletic, with the only commonalities of the supposed "branch" being shared archaisms and areal features that were encouraged by contact. Jacques & Michaud (2011) propose that Qiangic including Gyalrongic may belong to a larger Burmo-Qiangic group based on some lexical innovations.

Geographical distribution
The Gyalrongic languages are spoken in Sichuan in China, mainly in the autonomous Tibetan and Qiang prefectures of Karmdzes and Rngaba. These languages are distinguished by their conservative morphology and their phonological archaisms, which make them valuable for historical linguistics.

Gyalrongic languages are spoken predominantly in the four counties of Ma'erkang, Li, Xiaojin, and Jinchuan in Aba Prefecture, western Sichuan. Other Gyalrongic lects are spoken in neighboring Heishui, Rangtang, Baoxing, Danba, and Daofu counties.

Classification
The Gyalrongic languages share several features, notably in verbal morphology. More recent classifications such as Lai et al. (2020) split Gyalrongic into West and East branches:

West Gyalrongic
Khroskyabs (formerly known as Lavrung)
Horpa (or Stau)
Tangut
East Gyalrongic (or Gyalrong proper)

The Gyalrong languages in turn constitute four mutually unintelligible varieties: Eastern Gyalrong or Situ, Japhug, Tshobdun, and Zbu.

Khroskyabs and Horpa are classified by Lin (1993) as a "western dialect" of Gyalrong, along with Eastern Gyalrong and the "northwestern dialect" (Japhug, Tshobdun, and Zbu). Otherwise, the scholarly consensus deems the distance between Khroskyabs, Horpa, and the Gyalrong cluster is greater than that between the Gyalrong languages. For example, Ethnologue reports 75% lexical similarity between Situ and Japhug, 60% between Japhug and Tshobdun, but only 13% between Situ and Horpa.

Huang (2007:180) found that Horpa (Rta’u) and Gyalrong (Cogrtse) share only 15.2% cognacy, with 242 cognates out of a total of 1,592 words.

The Khalong Tibetan language has a Gyalrongic substratum.

The Chamdo languages (consisting of Lamo, Larong, and Drag-yab, a group of three closely related Sino-Tibetan languages spoken in Chamdo, eastern Tibet) may or may not be Qiangic.

References

Duo Erji [多尔吉]. 1984.  A study of Geshezha of Daofu County [道孚语格什扎话研究]. China Tibetan Studies Press [中国藏学出版社出版]. 
Gates, Jesse P. 2012. Situ in situ: towards a dialectology of Jiāróng (rGyalrong). M.A. thesis, Trinity Western University.
Gates, Jesse P. 2014. Situ in Situ: Towards a Dialectology of Jiarong (rGyalrong). LINCOM Studies in Asian Linguistics 80. Munich: Lincom Europa.

External links
rGyalrongic Languages Database (CLDF Dataset on Zenodo )
Proto-rGyalrong reconstruction  (Sino-Tibetan Branches Project)

Qiangic languages

br:Djiarongeg